The shepherd's hut (or shepherd's wagon) was, since the 15th century and into the 20th century, used by shepherds during sheep raising and lambing, primarily in the United Kingdom and France. Shepherd's huts often had iron wheels and corrugated iron tops. Sometimes the sides were also made of corrugated iron.

Background

Use of shepherd's huts by farmers reached a peak in the late 19th century and dwindled in the 20th century with the advent of mechanised farm machinery and electric power reaching even remote farms. Their use persisted in some northern counties in the United Kingdom, particularly Westmoreland and Northumberland, where the terrain of the uplands supports little else but sheep farming.

There have been numerous different materials used to construct shepherd's huts and after World War I, when metal was in short supply the chassis were often built with wood and the sides built with interlocking planks of larch or spruce. Sometimes the roof covering would be constructed from felt and tar and insulated with lambswool. Cast iron wheels were frequently recycled from other farm machinery. There are now very few examples of the later 20th century shepherd's huts in the county of Westmorland which became Cumbria in 1974.
 
The shepherd's hut was a kitchen, dining room, bedroom, sitting room and storeroom all rolled into one. The designs vary but all were constructed to provide the shepherd with practical and durable accommodation. The old huts had a stove in one corner for warmth and cooking, and a window on each side so the shepherd could see the flock. A hinged stable door, which was always positioned away from the prevailing wind, enabled him to hear the flock, and strong axles with cast iron wheels were used to withstand the constant movement from field to field.

Shepherds huts are still in use today, but primarily as glamping accommodation, or as an alternative to a summer house, shed or workshop.

See also

References

Further reading
 published book covering the history of Shepherds huts from medieval manuscript images to today's bespoke alternative use huts and vans.

External links 

 shepherdhuts.co.uk, a website devoted to historical shepherd huts; a UK database for surviving huts

Huts
Trailers
Tourist accommodations in the United Kingdom